With the competitions in shooting at the 1952 Summer Olympics in Helsinki, the Olympic shooting program began its expansion. Three new events were added: 100 metre running deer, 50 metre rifle three positions and trap. In total there were seven events held between 25 and 29 July 1952. No women participated in the 1952 shooting events. This was the first year that a new format was introduced as well: the sights on the guns were now located on the left side of the barrel.

Medal summary

Károly Takács stunned the world after winning the 25-metre rapid fire pistol event. In 1940, he was known as the most skilled shooter in the Hungarian armed forces and was thought to be a favorite in the event. Unfortunately, Takács lost a portion of his hand in an accident involving a hand grenade during an operation simulation. Despite his full recovery, he was no longer able to shoot with his dominant hand. Takács trained for 12 years, making his weak hand shooting ability as skilled as his dominant hand once was. Eventually, he went on to win gold in this sport, shocking the world in the process and motivating people around the world to overcome adversity.

Participating nations
A total of 218 shooters from 41 nations competed at the Helsinki Games:

Medal table

References

External links
 International Olympic Committee medal winners database

 
1952 Summer Olympics events
1952
Olympics
Shooting competitions in Finland